Prostanthera petraea is a species of flowering plant in the family Lamiaceae and is endemic to a restricted area near the Queensland–New South Wales border. It is a large shrub to small tree with ridged, glandular branches, egg-shaped leaves and white flowers usually without markings.

Description
Flowering occurs from late spring to early summer.

Taxonomy
Prostanthera petraea was first formally described in 2006 by Barry Conn in the journal Telopea from material collected in Bald Rock National Park in 1992.

Distribution and habitat
This mint-bush grows in woodland amongst granite boulders in the Boonoo Boonoo - Bald Rock area in far south-east Queensland and the Northern Tablelands of north-eastern New South Wales.

Conservation status
Prostanthera petraea is classified as "near threatened" in Queensland under the Queensland Government Nature Conservation Act 1992.

References

petraea
Flora of New South Wales
Flora of Queensland
Lamiales of Australia
Plants described in 2006
Taxa named by Barry John Conn